Tourneuxia is a genus of flowering plants in the tribe Cichorieae within the family Asteraceae.

Species
The only known species is Tourneuxia variifolia, native to North Africa (Morocco, Algeria, Tunisia, Libya).

References

Cichorieae
Flora of North Africa
Monotypic Asteraceae genera